Louis Robitaille (born March 16, 1982) is a Canadian former professional ice hockey forward who concluded his playing career with of the Albany Devils of the American Hockey League.

Playing career 
As a youth, Robitaille played in the 1996 Quebec International Pee-Wee Hockey Tournament with a minor ice hockey team from Châteauguay, Quebec.

While playing junior ice hockey, he took classes part-time at McGill University, majoring in French Literature.

Signed as a free agent in 2003 by the Washington Capitals, Robitaille played on the 2005–06 Calder Cup-winning Hershey Bears.

Robitaille made his debut with the Bears on Oct. 8, 2005 against the Wilkes-Barre/Scranton Penguins. He scored his first goal for Hershey on Nov. 19, 2005 against Philadelphia and picked up a game-winning goal Nov. 25, 2005 at Norfolk.

On August 28, 2008, Robitaille signed to play in Cortina, Italy, with the Cortina SG for 2008–09. However, on Dec. 9, 2008, Robitaille left the team due to family issues and returned to Canada to play for Saint-Hyacinthe Chiefs in the LNAH.

Robitaille returned to the AHL to play for the Lowell Devils for the 2009–10 season, and stayed with the team when it moved to Albany for 2010–11. After leading the Devils again in penalty minutes he then announced his retirement to become head coach of the QJAAAHL's Valleyfield Braves, a Junior AAA team based in Quebec.

Career statistics

References

External links
 
 Louis Robitaille Player Page

1982 births
Living people
Albany Devils players
Canadian ice hockey forwards
Hershey Bears players
Ice hockey people from Montreal
Lowell Devils players
Montreal Rocket players
Portland Pirates players
Quad City Mallards (UHL) players
Undrafted National Hockey League players
Victoriaville Tigres coaches
Washington Capitals players
Canadian ice hockey coaches